Yalıköy is a village in the District of Didim, Aydın Province, Turkey. As of 2010 it had a population of 1859 people.

References

Villages in Didim District